Farmrail System, Inc. is an employee-owned holding company for two Class III common-carrier railroads comprising "Western Oklahoma’s Regional Railroad" based in Clinton, Oklahoma. Farmrail Corporation  has acted since 1981 as a lessee-operator for Oklahoma Department of Transportation, managing an 82-mile east-west former  Rock Island  line between Weatherford and Erick and an additional 89 miles of former Santa Fe track, Westhorn-Elmer, acquired by the State in 1992 from the ATSF Railway.  Another wholly owned affiliate, Grainbelt Corporation (GNBC), was formed in 1987 to buy 176 contiguous north-south route-miles linking Enid and Frederick.

Operations
Farmrail Corporation ,  operates two connected lines:
An  line from Erick, Oklahoma, through Clinton, to Weatherford, Oklahoma.
A  line from Westhorn, Oklahoma, through Clinton, to Elmer, Oklahoma.

In addition, FMRC operates Finger Lakes Railway Corporation  as part of a joint venture; FGLK operates 168 miles of railway in New York state.

FMRC and Grainbelt traffic includes wheat, steel products, fertilizer, rail cars undergoing repair, gypsum rock and associated products, oil field materials, cotton, lumber, feed grains and meals, and farm implements.

The FMRC lines are owned by the state of Oklahoma and were leased to FMRC in 1993.  The Grainbelt line began operations as a short-line railroad in 1987.

BNSF named Farmrail System as its “Shortline of the Year” in 2017, citing the company’s entrepreneurial spirit and diligence in attracting new customers, and specifically noting Farmrail’s replacement of 8,400 crossties and more than 10,000 tons of ballast in less than one month to revitalize a siding and capture new business.

Equipment

References

External links

Farmrail System official website 
Link to Union Pacific Website with FMRC Details

Oklahoma railroads
Switching and terminal railroads
Spin-offs of the Chicago, Rock Island and Pacific Railroad
Railway companies established in 1981